Erenler may refer to:

Places in Turkey 
 Erenler, Artvin, a village in Artvin Province
 Erenler, Bayramören
 Erenler, Ceyhan, a village in Adana Province
 Erenler, Devrek, a village in Zonguldak Province
 Erenler, Sakarya, a municipality and district governorate in Sakarya Province
 Erenler, Afyonkarahisar, a populated place in Afyonkarahisar Province
 Erenler, Araklı, a populated place in Trabzon Province
 Erenler, Çayeli, a populated place in Rize Province
 Erenler, Devrekani, a populated place in Kastamonu Province
 Erenler, Karaçoban
 Erenler, Kırklareli, a town along the Sultans Trail, a long-distance footpath from Vienna to Istanbul
 Erenler, Oğuzlar
 Erenler, Orhaneli, a populated place in Bursa Province
 Erenler, Pınarhisar, a populated place in Kırklareli Province
 Erenler, Şile, a populated place in Istanbul Province

People 
 Mehmet Erenler, a Turkish folk musician
 Yaşar Erenler, a member of the computer engineering faculty at Istanbul Technical University, Turkey